República is a district in the city of São Paulo, Brazil.

Districts of São Paulo